is an underground railway station on the Rinkai Line in Kōtō, Tokyo, Japan, operated by Tokyo Waterfront Area Rapid Transit (TWR).

Lines

Services

Station layout
The station has a single underground island platform serving two tracks.

Adjacent stations

History
The station opened on 30 March 1996, and initially formed the terminus of the line from Shin-Kiba before it was extended to Osaki.

Station numbering was introduced in 2016 with Shinonome being assigned station number R04.

Surrounding area
There is a bus station adjacent, which serves as the terminus to three routes (two of which are numbered 01, preceded by a kanji character). The more regular service runs to Monzen-nakacho Station on the Tokyo Metro Tozai Line and the Toei Oedo Line.

Attractions, including shopping centres, in the vicinity include:
 Miraikan
 Museum of Maritime Science
 Odaiba Kaihin Park
 Fuji TV Headquarters
 Tokyo International Exchange Center
 Decks Tokyo Beach
 Aqua City Odaiba
 DiverCity Tokyo
 Palette Town
 Zepp Tokyo
 Venus Fort
 Meg@web (Toyota's exhibition hall, including a small motor museum)
 Daikanransha

Bus terminal

Long-distance buses 
 Skytree Shuttle; For Kinshichō Station and Tokyo Skytree
 For Tsukuba Station and Tsuchiura Station
 For Kashimajingū Station
 For Yokohama Station
 For Haneda Airport
 Fantasia Nagoya; For Hoshigaoka Station, Motoyama Station, Chikusa Station, Sakae Station, and Nagoya Station

See also
 List of railway stations in Japan

References

External links

  

Railway stations in Japan opened in 1996
TWR Rinkai Line
Stations of Tokyo Waterfront Area Rapid Transit
Railway stations in Tokyo